Didogobius wirtzi is a species of marine fish in the family Gobiidae, the gobies. The species was first described by Kovačić and Schliewen in 2008.

Description

The fish grows to maximum 3.0 cm length.

Etymology
The specific name honours Peter Wirtz, a marine biologist at the University of Madeira who collected the types of this species and amicuscaridis, as well as numerous other Gobiiformes. His collection is now housed in the Zoologische Staatssammlung München in Munich.

References

Further reading

wirtzi
Fish described in 2008
Fish of West Africa